Gert Brauer (7 September 1955 – January 2018) was a German footballer.

Club career 
He played 270 Oberliga matches in East Germany.

International career 
Three of his four international matches for East Germany where part of the UEFA Euro 1980 qualifying.

Trivia 
Brauer died in January 2018.

External links

References 

1955 births
2018 deaths
German footballers
East German footballers
East Germany international footballers
FC Carl Zeiss Jena players
Association football defenders
People from Greiz (district)
People from Bezirk Gera
DDR-Oberliga players